Kal is a former village in central Slovenia in the Municipality of Zagorje ob Savi. It is now part of the village of Kolovrat. It is part of the traditional region of Upper Carniola and is now included in the Central Sava Statistical Region.

Geography
Kal stands southwest of the village center of Kolovrat, below the south slope of Kal Hill (elevation ).

Name
The name Kal literally means 'pond', based on the common noun kal 'pond, watering hole' and referring to a local geographical feature.

History
Kal was annexed by Kolovrat 1953, ending its existence as a separate settlement.

References

External links
Kal on Geopedia

Populated places in the Municipality of Zagorje ob Savi
Former settlements in Slovenia